White Like Me: Reflections on Race from a Privileged Son is a book by activist and writer Tim Wise. It is a personal account examining white privilege and his conception of racism in American society through his experiences with his family and in his community. The title is based on the book Black Like Me written by John Howard Griffin.

Film adaptation
In 2013, the book was adapted into a documentary film. The film was financed through a successful Kickstarter campaign. Wise looks at the subject of ethnicity in the United States.

References

External links

Books about race and ethnicity
2007 non-fiction books
American non-fiction books
Books about activists
Soft Skull Press books
Works about White Americans
Books about Jews and Judaism